Demophon or Demophoon may refer to:

Mythology
 Demophon of Athens, son of Theseus and Phaedra
 Demophon of Eleusis, or Demophoon, son of King Celeus and Queen Metanira

Music
 Demofonte or Demofoonte, 1731 Italian-language libretto by Metastasio
 Demofoonte (Gluck), 1743 Italian-language opera by Christoph Willibald Gluck
 Demofoonte (Mysliveček, 1775), Italian-language opera by Josef Mysliveček
 Demofoonte (Mysliveček, 1769), Italian-language opera by Josef Mysliveček
 Demofonte (Berezovsky), 1773 Italian-language opera by Maksym Berezovsky
 Démophon, 1789 French-language opera by Johann Christoph Vogel
 Démophoon, 1788 French-language opera by Luigi Cherubini

Other
 Demophon (seer), a seer in Alexander's entourage

See also
4057 Demophon, asteroid named after Demophon of Athens